Ferenc Bessenyei (10 February 1919 – 27 December 2004) was a Hungarian actor and singer. He began his career in the choir at National Theatre of Szeged in 1940 and became one of Hungary's most respected stage performers. As singer he appeared in My Fair Lady (as Higgins), Fiddler on the Roof (as milkman Tevje) and Zorba the Greek (as Zorba). He was a tall man with a deep, powerful voice. He was elected to the Revolutionary Council of the Hungarian Intelligentsia in the 1956 revolt and was not allowed to perform for two years. He was awarded the "Actor of Nation" in 2000. He appeared in 75 films between 1960 and 2001. His second wife was Hédi Váradi actress.

Selected filmography
 Kiskrajcár (1953)
 Young Hearts (1953)
 Under the City (1953)
 Professor Hannibal (1956)
 Alba Regia (1961)
 The Brute (1961)
 Drama of the Lark (1963)
 The Testament of Aga Koppanyi (1967)
 Stars of Eger (1968)
 Franz Liszt. Dreams of love (1970)
  (1972)
 Hugo the Hippo (1973)

References

External links

1919 births
2004 deaths
Hungarian male film actors
People from Hódmezővásárhely
20th-century Hungarian male actors
Hungarian male television actors